Saadjärve is a village in Tartu Parish, Tartu County in Estonia. It is located about 17 km north of the city of Tartu, on the eastern shore of Lake Saadjärv. Saadjärve has a population of 118 (as of 1 January 2012).

Saadjärve manor

Saadjärve estate is mentioned for the first time in historical records in 1557. During the course of history, it has belonged to a variety of Baltic German local aristocratic families. The present building dates from the late 18th or early 19th century.

Notable residents
Saadjärve is the birthplace of Estonian politician Johannes Sikkar (1897–1960).

See also
 List of palaces and manor houses in Estonia

References

Villages in Tartu County
Manor houses in Estonia